Perrotia is a genus of fungi within the Hyaloscyphaceae family. The genus contains 19 species.

References

External links
Perrotia at Index Fungorum

Hyaloscyphaceae
Taxa named by Jean Louis Émile Boudier